Sebastian 2015 Tour was a concert tour by Turkish singer Hande Yener, in support of her eleventh studio album, Mükemmel (2014). It was named after the song "Sebastian", which Yener had performed for Volga Tamöz's album No. 2. The tour was first announced on 6 March 2015 by producer Polat Yağcı. It began on 13 March 2015 in Turkey and concluded in September 2015. Alongside Turkey, Yener also had concerts in Germany, Austria, Azerbaijan, the Netherlands and Northern Cyprus. During the tour, Yener wore outfits that were estimated to be €30,000 and was accompanied by a team of 16 people.

Set list 
This set list is from the concert on 31 July 2015 at the Cemil Topuzlu Open-Air Theatre. It is not intended to represent all shows from the tour.
"Naber"
"Alt Dudak"
"Yalanın Batsın"
"Acele Etme"
"Acı Veriyor"
"Sopa"
"Rüya"
"Hasta"
"Bana Anlat"
"Kışkışşş"
"Kırmızı"
"Sebastian"
"Kelepçe"
"Armağan"
"Bodrum"
"Haberi Var mı?"
"Yoksa Mani"
"Atma"
"Aşkın Ateşi"
"Kibir (Yanmam Lazım)"
"Romeo"
"Hani Bana"

Shows

Cancelled shows

Notes 
A  This concert was planned to be held on 18 May 2015, but the date was changed after the attack on HDP's headquarters in Mersin.
B  The concert at Park Vera Shopping Center was planned to be held on 24 May but this date was later changed to 5 June.
C  On 25  May, it was announced that Yener would perform in Mersin.
D  It was initially announced in March that on 6 September 2015 Yener would perform at the Muğla Club Pasha, but on the banners released in May 2015 for the tour the location was changed to Kırklareli.

References

External links 
Official website

2015 concert tours